The 1934 French Grand Prix (formally the XXVIII Grand Prix de l'Automobile Club de France) was a Grand Prix motor race held on 1 July 1934 at Montlhéry. The race comprised 40 laps of a 12.5 km circuit, for a total race distance of 500.0 km. This race was the first outside of Germany to see the Silver Arrows of Auto Union and Mercedes-Benz, which would go on to dominate Grand Prix racing until the start of World War II.

The race was won by Louis Chiron driving an Alfa Romeo. Chiron lead from the start, jumping the start to lead the first lap, but was quickly challenged by the Germans. Stuck, who made a poor start, was able to take the lead on lap 3, while down the field the Mercedes' and other Alfa Romeos and Auto Unions battled for the remaining places, while the Bugattis and Maseratis showed themselves to be totally outclassed. With Stuck's Auto Union slowing, Chiron retook the lead on lap 9. This he held to the end, as although he was pressured by the Mercedes of Fagioli and Caracciola, this ultimately came to nothing, as by the end of the race not a single German car was still running.

Starting grid

Classification

References

External links

French Grand Prix
French Grand Prix
Grand Prix